"Corn Bread" is a 1948 instrumental by the Hal Singer Sextette.  The single recorded on the Savoy Record Label was Hal Singer's debut on the R&B charts and the song went to number one on that chart.

References

1948 songs
Instrumentals
Song articles with missing songwriters